Gargela is a genus of moths in the subfamily Crambinae of the family Crambidae. The genus currently comprises 22 Austral-Asian species, of which the majority has been described in recent years. Many species remain to be described, with their total number probably being around 40 species.

Species 

 Gargela albidusa Song, Chen & Wu, 2009
 Gargela apicalis (Pagenstecher, 1900)
 Gargela arcualis Hampson, 1906
 Gargela bilineata Song, Chen & Wu, 2009
 Gargela chrysias (Meyrick, 1897)
 Gargela cuprealis Hampson, 1906
 Gargela distigma Song, Chen & Wu, 2009
 Gargela furca Song, Chen & Wu, 2009
 Gargela fuscusa Song, Chen & Wu, 2009
 Gargela grandispinata Li in Yang, Jie & Li, 2019
 Gargela hainana Song, Chen & Wu, 2009
 Gargela hastatela Song, Chen & Wu, 2009
 Gargela minuta Song, Chen & Wu, 2009
 Gargela niphostola Hampson, 1917
 Gargela obliquivitta Hampson, 1917
 Gargela polyacantha Li in Yang, Jie & Li, 2019
 Gargela quadrispinula Song, Chen & Wu, 2009
 Gargela renatusalis (Walker, 1859)
 Gargela subpurella (Walker, 1864)
 Gargela trilinealis (Hampson, 1897)
 Gargela xanthocasis (Meyrick, 1897)
 Gargela xizangensis Song, Chen & Wu, 2009

References 

Crambinae
Crambidae genera
Taxa named by Francis Walker (entomologist)